The Castilla–La Mancha Bridge (Spanish: Puente de Castilla-La Mancha) is a cable-stayed bridge in Talavera de la Reina, Spain.

History and description 
Promoted by the Regional Government of Castile-La Mancha, the foundation stone was laid in November 2007. It was opened on 17 October 2011. The building companies were Sacyr, Aglomancha and J. Bárcenas.

Standing 192 m high, it was the tallest cable-stayed bridge in Spain upon the time of its inauguration. It features 152 wire ropes.

With a total cost of nearly €74M, it was widely considered a waste of money in the media.

References 
Citations

Bibliography
 

Bridges in Talavera de la Reina
Bridges over the Tagus
Bridges completed in 2011